Samantha Faye Sendel (born October 10, 1991 in Montreal, Quebec) is a Canadian individual and synchronised trampoline gymnast, representing her nation at international competitions. She competed at world championships, including at the 2009, 2011, 2013, 2014 and 2015 Trampoline World Championships. She was Canada's alternate female trampoline competitor in the 2016 Summer Olympics in Rio de Janeiro.

Personal
She lives in Aurora, Ontario. After the Canadian Olympic Committee unveiled LGBT initiatives in December 2014, including a partnership with You Can Play, Sendel came out as a lesbian

References

External links
 
 

1991 births
Living people
Canadian female trampolinists
Gymnasts from Montreal
Lesbian sportswomen
LGBT gymnasts
Canadian LGBT sportspeople
Medalists at the Trampoline Gymnastics World Championships